The Absolute Collection is the second greatest hits album by American-Scottish alternative rock band Garbage. It was released in Australia and New Zealand on November 2, 2012 on their own label Stunvolume, via Liberation Music, and supersedes the band's previous major label compilation, Absolute Garbage. The album was released in advance of the band's 2013 tourdates throughout both countries.

The collection compiles a run of singles from throughout the band's career, including the band's three Australian top twenty hits "Cherry Lips (Go Baby Go!)", "Breaking Up the Girl" and "Why Do You Love Me", and follows the release of the band's fifth studio album, Not Your Kind of People, which reached the top ten earlier in 2012. The Absolute Collection charted at #88 for a single week on the ARIA Charts.

In 2015, The Absolute Collection was remastered for iTunes. On this re-release, "#1 Crush" was replaced with the original version from Garbage: 20th Anniversary Super Deluxe Edition.

Album package
The Absolute Collection track listing differs from 2007's worldwide release Absolute Garbage: it is not chronologically sequenced and the single inclusions favour towards the latter half of the band's career. Unlike the earlier compilation, The Absolute Collection includes both "Androgyny" and "Breaking Up the Girl", which reached #21 and #19 on the Australian singles chart respectively; inversely, it omits both "You Look So Fine" and the band's James Bond theme, "The World Is Not Enough". Both singles failed to chart in either Australia or New Zealand. The Absolute Collection also includes "Supervixen", a cut from the band's debut album, and their most recent single releases, "Blood for Poppies" and "Big Bright World", both from 2012's Not Your Kind of People.

In place of an extended bio, the band compiled a thanks list for the album booklet, while the album artwork was designed by Ryan Corey for Smog Design, from artwork created for the Not Your Kind of People booklet with a group shot image photographed by Paul Scala. The booklet also compiled a number of promotional photographs of the group taken over the course of their career by Stéphane Sednaoui, Ellen von Unwerth, Rankin, Autumn de Wilde, Warwick Saint and Joseph Cultice.

Track listing

Release history

Charts

References

External links
Garbage official website
The Absolute Collection at Garbage-Discography.co.uk

2012 greatest hits albums
Liberation Music compilation albums
Garbage (band) compilation albums